Enekia Kasonga Lunyamila (born 20 April 2002) is a Tanzanian professional footballer who plays as a striker  for AUSFAZ in the Morocco Professional Women's League, and for the Tanzania women's national team.

International career 
Lunyamila played for the Tanzania national U-20 team in 2019 and 2020. She played a key role and scored 4 goals en route to the team winning the 2019 COSAFA U-20 Women's Championship. At the end of the competition she was adjudged player of the tournament.

Kasonga capped for the Tanzania women's national team during the 2020 COSAFA Women's Championship and 2021 COSAFA Women's Championship. She scored the lone goal, the winning goal in the 2021 final against Malawi to help Tanzania win the tournament for the first time in its history.

Honours 
Tanzania
 COSAFA U-20 Women's Championship: 2019
 COSAFA Women's Championship: 2021
Individual
 COSAFA U-20 Women's Championship Player of the Tournament: 2019
 Best player of Morocco women's professional  first league 2021/22

References

External links 

 
 

Living people
2002 births
Tanzanian women's footballers
Tanzania women's international footballers
Women's association football defenders